Nudist Colony of the Dead is a 1991 horror comedy musical film written and directed by Mark Pirro (who has also worked under the names Marky Dolittle and Marky Elfman). The film was shot on Super-8 film and produced on a budget of $35,000.

Storyline 
"Sunny Buttocks Nudist Colony" is shut down by Judge Rhinehole and his band of religious zealots for offending the local community. The nudists decide to protest by entering into a suicide pact, vowing to return one day to terrorize the people who took over their land. Five years later, a bunch of kids are sent to the ex-nudist colony, which has now been transformed into a religious retreat. True to their promise, the nudist corpses rise from the grave, seek revenge on the zealots who condemned them and sing big production numbers, as the campers begin to experience an attrition problem.

Cast 
 Deborah Stern as Shelly Mammarosa
 Tony Cicchetti as Art Shoe
 Rachel Latt as Mrs. Druple
 Braddon Mendelson as Peter Trickle
 Jim Bruce as Billy McRighteous
 Barbara Dow as Mrs. Mammarosa
 Heather McPherson as Fanny Wype
 Peter Napoles as Juan Tu
 Steve Wilcox as Lou Jobee
 Juan Tanamera as Gus Unteide 
 Forrest J. Ackerman as Judge Rhinehole
 Dave Robinson as Reverend Ritz

Production 
Nudist Colony of the Dead was shot in Sacramento, California.

Reception 
Writing in The Zombie Movie Encyclopedia, academic Peter Dendle said, "[T]his amateur summer-camp slasher spoof isn't as wacky as it thinks it is".

References

External links 
 
 

1991 films
1991 horror films
American comedy horror films
1990s comedy horror films
American zombie films
Zombie comedy films
American films about revenge
American exploitation films
American supernatural horror films
1991 comedy films
1990s English-language films
1990s American films